The men's heavyweight event was part of the weightlifting programme at the 1924 Summer Olympics. The weight class was the heaviest contested, and allowed weightlifters of over 82.5 kilograms (181.5 pounds). The competition was held on Wednesday, 23 July 1924.

Results
One hand snatch

One hand clean & jerk

Press

Two hand snatch

Two hand clean & jerk

Final standing after the last event:

References

Sources
 Olympic Report 
 

Heavyweight